Abdullah Khalifa Segher (born 6 April 1997) is a Saudi Arabian footballer who plays as a midfielder.

Career
Segher started his career at Al-Shabab and is a product of the Al-Shabab youth system. On 6 April 2018, he made his professional debut against Al-Taawoun in the Pro League.

Career statistics

References

1997 births
Living people
Saudi Arabian footballers
Association football midfielders
Al-Shabab FC (Riyadh) players
Al-Hejaz Club players
Saudi Professional League players
Saudi Second Division players
Saudi Third Division players